The Infinity Stones are fictional items in the Marvel Cinematic Universe (MCU). They play a significant role in the first three phases (also called the "Infinity Saga") of the MCU, including being the MacGuffins of the films Avengers: Infinity War and Avengers: Endgame. They also play a major role in the Blip. The Infinity Stones are based on the Infinity Gems from Marvel Comics.

Fictional history

Background
The existence of the Infinity Stones has been described as the "one driving force that unifies all the robot-alien-hero fighting". In Guardians of the Galaxy (2014), the Collector explains that the Infinity Stones are the remnants of six singularities that existed before the Big Bang, which were compressed into Stones by cosmic entities after the universe began and which were dispersed throughout the cosmos. In Avengers: Infinity War (2018), it is further explained by Wong and Stephen Strange that each Infinity Stone embodies and controls an essential aspect of existence.

Infinity Saga
Thanos seeks to collect all of the Infinity Stones and use them to kill half of all life in the universe, believing that his plan will save it from extinction. At one point, he managed to find the Mind Stone.

In 1942, the Space Stone, encased in a cube-like object called the Tesseract, is discovered to have been brought to Earth by Asgardians years ago and left behind. Hydra later obtained the Tesseract and used it to power their weaponry. After Red Skull was defeated by Steve Rogers, the Tesseract transported Red Skull to the planet Vormir (cursing him to serve as the Soul Stone's keeper) as punishment for abusing its powers and falls into the ocean, but it was later recovered by S.H.I.E.L.D. In 1989, Dr. Wendy Lawson tried to use the Tesseract to unlock light-speed travel, but fails; her actions accidentally gave Carol Danvers superpowers.
 
In 2012, Thanos enlists the help of Loki to get the Space Stone and gives him a scepter containing the Mind Stone to aid him. He was eventually defeated by the Avengers and the Tesseract was taken back to Asgard while the scepter ended up in Hydra's hands, who used it to give Petro and Wanda Maximoff superpowers. The Avengers eventually took the scepter back, but Tony Stark's experiment on the Mind Stone creates the rogue A.I. Ultron, who tried to use the Stone to create a new body. The body was later stolen from him and used to create the android Vision, with the Mind Stone stored in his forehead.

In 2013, the Reality Stone, converted into a liquid-like substance called the Aether, is found by Jane Foster and it infects her. Malekith later extracts it from her and attempts to use it to plunge the universe into darkness, but was stopped by Thor. The Aether was then given to the Collector by the Asgardians as it was too dangerous to keep it near the Tesseract, but they did not know that the Collector also planned to get the other five.

In 2014, Thanos enlists the help of Ronan the Accuser to collect the Power Stone, which is stored in an orb located on the planet Morag, and has Gamora and Nebula help him, but Star Lord obtains it first. Following a war between Ronan and the Guardians of the Galaxy for the orb, Ronan is defeated and the orb was given to the Nova Corps, who had it sealed in a vault.

In 2015, Thanos decides to collect the Stones himself and obtains the Infinity Gauntlet.

In 2018, Thanos starts by stealing the Power Stone from Xander and then obtains the Space Stone (which Loki stole after Asgard's destruction) after destroying Thor's ship and crushing the Tesseract to extract the Stone. The third Stone that Thanos acquires is the Reality Stone (having been converted back into its solid state) and uses its powers to trick the Guardians of the Galaxy and kidnap Gamora. He later reluctantly sacrifices Gamora to get the Soul Stone at Vormir's shrine. After fighting some of the heroes on his homeworld Titan, Dr. Strange surrenders the Time Stone to him to save Tony Stark; he intentionally did this to ensure that the timeline will lead into the future where Thanos is defeated. The Mind Stone is the last Stone to be obtained by Thanos, who kills Vision in the process. After initiating the Blip, Thanos lives in exile and destroys the Stones so that his actions cannot be undone. Thor kills Thanos in retaliation.

Five years later, the surviving Avengers use the Quantum Realm to travel back in time to 1970, 2012, 2013, and 2014 to retrieve Stones that were present in those alternate time periods (their actions in the past don't affect the current timeline; they instead create alternate timelines, though the alternate 2012 is deleted by the Time Variance Authority due to that timeline's Loki making his escape with the Space Stone when the Avengers' attempt to obtain it goes wrong, which the TVA believes wasn't supposed to happen), allowing them to undo Thanos' actions. However, Thanos from the alternate 2014 (having been alerted by their actions thanks to Nebula's cybernetic implants linking with her past self) is able to follow them to the present and, believing that his plan only failed because the survivors were unable to "move on" from the losses, he attempts to use the time-displaced Infinity Stones to destroy the entire universe and create a new one out of revenge for the Blip being undone. During the resulting full-scale battle between the Avengers and the alternate 2014 Thanos, Tony Stark claims the past Infinity Stones and uses them to defeat 2014 Thanos and his forces at the cost of his life. Afterwards, Steve Rogers subsequently returns the alternate past Infinity Stones and an alternate version of Mjolnir that Thor took from the alternate 2013 to their respective time periods (without their containers and with the 2013 Reality Stone in its solid form) to ensure the survival of the alternate timelines.

Post–Endgame
 In a flashback in the penultimate episode of WandaVision, the moment of Hydra's experimentation with the Mind Stone on Wanda Maximoff is shown; her exposure to it had tapped into her innate magic and made her inordinately more powerful, as well as giving her a prophetic vision of her Scarlet Witch persona.
 In the first episode of Loki, as alternate 2012 Loki tries to retrieve the alternate 2012 Tesseract, he discovers the Time Variance Authority owns confiscated variants of the Infinity Stones from deleted timelines (which presumably includes the timelines from Avengers: Endgame); these variants of the Stones are simply used as paperweights by some of the TVA's workers due to the Stones being ineffective as the entire facility exists outside of the Multiverse.
 The Stones make numerous appearances in What If...? as events stray from the Sacred Timeline.
 In an alternate version of World War II, Howard Stark uses the confiscated Tesseract (Space Stone) as the power source for the Hydra Stomper.
 In one universe, T'Challa, rather than Peter Quill, finds the Power Stone on Morag. 
 An alternate version of Stephen Strange attempts to use the Time Stone to revive Christine Palmer, only to find her death is an absolute point in his universe, despite his countless attempts to avert the scenario. It becomes the only Stone left in existence in his universe due to his subsequent actions.
 As one universe suffers from a quantum zombie outbreak, Vision discovers that his Mind Stone can be used to cure the infected. However, it is unable to cure the infected Wanda Maximoff, speculated to be due to her powers coming from the Stone, prompting Vision to initially try and feed other survivors to Wanda to keep her calm until he can properly cure her. When other heroes find him, Vision accepts that his actions are wrong and he gives the stone to the surviving heroes to take to Wakanda, sacrificing himself out of guilt. However, a zombified Thanos arrives in Wakanda, possessing the other five Infinity Stones in his Gauntlet. 
 In another scenario, Thanos once again arrives on Earth with five Stones, only to discover that the Avengers lost to Ultron, who is in possession of Vision's vibranium body and the Mind Stone. Ultron kills Thanos and takes the Stones for himself, using them to conquer and destroy his universe. When this task is complete, Ultron attains a higher level of consciousness and uses the Stones to travel into other dimensions and duel Uatu, the Watcher. To stop Infinity Ultron expanding into other universes, the Watcher assembles the Guardians of the Multiverse, a team of heroes from various alternate realities and gifts them a weapon to destroy the Stones called the Infinity Crusher. When the Crusher fails (due to it begin designed to only work for the Stones in its respective universe), the heroes kill Ultron by uploading Arnim Zola's analog consciousness into his body. The Stones are nearly taken by Black Panther/Erik Killmonger, but he is stopped by Zola, who tries to take the Stones for himself. Strange Supreme and the Watcher imprison them along with the Stones in a pocket dimension, frozen outside of time so that neither they nor the "Ultron Stones" can be a threat anymore.

List of Infinity Stones

Space Stone

Originally housed in the Tesseract, the Space Stone (blue) first appears in the mid-credits scene of Thor, with Nick Fury showing the object to Erik Selvig, not knowing that Loki was also there. 

In Captain America: The First Avenger, the Red Skull steals the Tesseract from a church and uses it to power Hydra's weaponry during World War II. Amidst Steve Rogers's final fight against Red Skull, the Tesseract transported the latter to another location (later revealed to be the planet Vormir in Avengers: Infinity War) before falling into the Arctic Ocean where it was later recovered by Howard Stark and taken to a secret base.

In Captain Marvel, it is revealed that Dr. Wendy Lawson tried to use the Tesseract in 1989 to unlock light-speed travel in order to help the Skrulls find a new home, but was unsuccessful, although her experiments resulted in Carol Danvers being granted superhuman strength, flight, and the ability to generate energy blasts. Danvers eventually recovers the Tesseract and hands the object over to S.H.I.E.L.D., although it was temporarily swallowed by Goose (a Flerken disguised as a cat), who later vomits it out on Fury's desk.

In The Avengers, the Tesseract is shown to be capable of generating wormholes after Loki steals it from S.H.I.E.L.D. and uses it to transport the Chitauri army to New York City in an attempt to conquer Earth. After the Avengers repel the invasion, Thor returns it to Asgard for safekeeping in Odin's Vault, and it is used to repair the Bifrost.

In Thor: Ragnarok, Loki takes the Tesseract before Asgard's destruction.

In Avengers: Infinity War, Loki gives Thanos the Tesseract in order to save Thor's life. Thanos then crushes the Tesseract to acquire the Space Stone and uses it to teleport to Knowhere, Vormir, Titan, Wakanda, and the Garden. After Thanos initiates the Blip, the Space Stone is destroyed to prevent further use.

In Avengers: Endgame, Rogers, Tony Stark, Scott Lang, and Bruce Banner travel via Quantum Realm to an alternate 2012, where Stark and Lang attempt to steal the alternate 2012 Tesseract, but the alternate 2012 Hulk accidentally knocks Stark down and the 2012 Tesseract is taken by the alternate 2012 Loki, who uses it to open a wormhole and escape. Stark and Rogers then travel to an alternate 1970 and take the alternate 1970 Tesseract from Camp Lehigh, New Jersey. The 1970 Space Stone (having been removed from the Tesseract) is brought back to the main timeline, used to undo the Blip, and defeat a past version of Thanos from an alternate 2014. Later, Rogers returns the 1970 Space Stone to the alternate 1970.

In Loki, the 2012 Tesseract is confiscated by the Time Variance Authority. Later, Loki tries to retrieve the Tesseract only to find that it is powerless in the Time Variance Authority’s dimension. Loki presumably abandons the Tesseract after he discovers that the Time Variance Authority has captured dozens of powerless Infinity Stones from other timelines.

In the first episode of What If...?, the Space Stone, still housed in the Tesseract, appears in an alternate timeline that copies the events of Captain America: The First Avenger, with major differences including Peggy Carter recovering the Tesseract from Hydra over a year after Project Rebirth, Howard Stark using the Tesseract to power an armor called the Hydra Stomper for Rogers to use, Red Skull using the Tesseract to summon an alien creature that subsequently kills him, and the Tesseract opening a portal in modern day that Carter emerges from. In the fifth episode, another alternate version of the Space Stone appears in the possession of a zombified Thanos. In the eighth episode, a third alternate version of the Space Stone appears in another alternate timeline in Thanos' possession before being taken by Ultron (who also briefly appears at the end of the seventh episode). Ultron proceeds to use the Stones to conquer the universe, and eventually the Multiverse, for peace. In the ninth episode, the Space Stone is taken from Ultron by Erik Killmonger after the former was killed by Arnim Zola's analog consciousness. When Zola attempts to take the Stones from Killmonger, they both end up trapped in a pocket dimension along with the Stones.

A 2018 article in Extreme Mechanics Letters proposed that Thanos would have needed "a minimum grip strength of over 40,000 tons, which is approximately 750,000 times that of a typical man", to break the Tesseract depicted in the film, presuming that the object was an "all-carbon nano-tesseract or hypercube projected into 3D space".

Mind Stone
Originally housed in Loki's scepter, the Mind Stone (yellow) was first seen in The Avengers when Loki is given a scepter by Thanos and the Other to help locate the Tesseract and conquer Earth with its ability to control people's minds and project energy blasts. After Loki's defeat, the scepter falls into the hands of Hydra leader Baron Wolfgang von Strucker, who is shown in the mid-credits scene of Captain America: The Winter Soldier to have been using it to experiment on humans.

In Avengers: Age of Ultron, it is revealed that the only surviving subjects of Strucker's experiments are the siblings Pietro Maximoff and Wanda Maximoff, in whom superhuman abilities were unlocked (in the latter's case, amplifying her innate magic) before Strucker's base is attacked by the Avengers, who take back the scepter. The scepter is later revealed to contain the Mind Stone, which itself contains an artificial intelligence that grants sentience to the computer program Ultron, who steals the scepter and removes the Mind Stone to create a newly upgraded body. The Avengers steal the Mind Stone–infused body from Ultron and upload the A.I. J.A.R.V.I.S. into it, giving birth to the android Vision. The Mind Stone can also enhance the user's intelligence, grant them immense knowledge, and create new life.

In Avengers: Infinity War, Vision is injured by the Children of Thanos in their attempts to get the Mind Stone and is taken to Wakanda to have it removed by Shuri, in the hope that Vision would be able to live without it. When the removal operation is interrupted, Wanda is forced to destroy Vision and the Mind Stone, only for Thanos to use the Time Stone to repair them both and collect the latter. After Thanos wipes out half of all life in the universe, the Mind Stone is destroyed to prevent further use.

In Avengers: Endgame, Rogers, having time-traveled to an alternate 2012, retrieves the alternate 2012 scepter. Rogers then uses the scepter to render his alternate 2012 self unconscious after he mistook him for a disguised Loki. The alternate 2012 Mind Stone, after being removed from the scepter, is brought back to the main timeline and used to undo the Blip and defeat a past version of Thanos from an alternate 2014. Afterwards, Rogers returns the 2012 Mind Stone to its respective point in time.

The Mind Stone appears in two series released on the Disney+ streaming service: In the live-action series WandaVision, Wanda Maximoff uses her connection with the Mind Stone to reanimate a fake Vision, while in the fifth episode of the animated What If...? series, set in an alternate universe, Peter Parker, T’Challa, and Scott Lang, who are the survivors of a zombie apocalypse, attempt to use the Mind Stone as a cure for the plague. Another alternate version of the Mind Stone appears at the end of the seventh episode in Ultron's possession. In the eighth episode (which explains the previous episode's ending), Ultron successfully uploads himself to the Mind Stone-infused body, and proceeds to use the Mind Stone to defeat the Avengers, sends Earth into a nuclear winter, kills Thanos by using his beam, and with the rest of the stones conquer the universe and the greater multiverse. In the ninth episode, the Mind Stone is sealed in a pocket dimension with the other Stones, Killmonger, and Arnim Zola following Ultron's defeat. A third alternate version of the Mind Stone appears at the end of the episode, still housed within Loki's scepter, which Romanoff uses to defeat Loki.

Reality Stone
The Reality Stone (red) first appears in Thor: The Dark World as a fluid-like weapon called the Aether when Malekith the Accursed attempts to use it to destroy the Nine Realms and return the universe to its pre-Big Bang state; only to be thwarted by Bor, who had it hidden. Jane Foster becomes infected by the Aether after coming across its resting place, though Malekith later draws it out of her. After Malekith is defeated by Thor, Sif and Volstagg seal the Aether in a lantern-like container and entrust it to the Collector to keep it separate from the Tesseract; as they consider it unwise to have multiple Infinity Stones close to each other. The Aether, once bonded to a host, can turn anything into dark matter as well as suck the life force out of humans and other mortals. The Aether can also disrupt the laws of physics and repel threats if it senses any.

In Avengers: Infinity War, Thanos acquires the Aether from the Collector and turns it back into the Reality Stone off-screen; allowing him to repel the Guardians of the Galaxy's attacks by turning Drax the Destroyer to rocks, Mantis into ribbon strips, and causing Star-Lord's gun to shoot bubbles. Thanos later uses the Stone to create a rock restraint around Natasha Romanoff. After Thanos wipes out half of all life in the universe, the Reality Stone is destroyed to prevent further use.

In Avengers: Endgame, Thor and Rocket travel back in time to Asgard in an alternate 2013 to extract the alternate 2013 Aether from the alternate 2013 Jane Foster. The 2013 Reality Stone (having been converted back into its solid form) is then brought back to 2023 and used to undo the Blip and to disintegrate a past version of Thanos from an alternate 2014. Rogers later returns the 2013 Reality Stone to the alternate 2013 Asgard.

In the fifth episode of What If...?, an alternate version of the Reality Stone appears in the possession of a zombified Thanos. In the eighth episode, another alternate version of the Reality Stone appears in the possession of Ultron (who also appears at the end of the seventh episode), taking the Reality Stone away from Thanos after killing him in order to conquer the universe and the multiverse. Ultron also uses the Stone to recreate his Ultron Sentries. In the ninth episode, the Reality Stone is taken from Ultron by Killmonger after the former was killed by Arnim Zola. When Zola attempts to take the Stones from Killmonger, they end up trapped in a pocket dimension along with the Stones.

Power Stone
Housed in the Orb hidden on the planet Morag, the Power Stone (purple) can increase the user's strength and destroy entire civilizations with a single blast. However, the stone is too much for most mortal beings to physically handle because its power will destroy them on contact. In Guardians of the Galaxy, Ronan the Accuser seeks the orb for Thanos, but Star-Lord finds and steals the orb from Morag's resting spot before Korath could. Ronan eventually steals it from the Guardians of the Galaxy. After learning about the Power Stone; however, Ronan betrays Thanos and tries to use its destructive power to destroy the planet Xandar.  During the battle to protect Xandar, by sharing the burden of the Power Stone's energy, the Guardians are able to use it to kill Ronan. It's revealed that Peter Quill's half-Celestial physiology was what allowed him to withstand the Stone's power on his own for a brief time before the other Guardians joined with him. They seal the Power Stone in a new orb and entrust it to the Nova Corps for safekeeping.

In Avengers: Infinity War, it is revealed that the Power Stone was the first to be obtained by Thanos, who "decimates" Xandar in the process. Thanos uses the Stone to destroy the Statesman and during the battle on Titan against Tony Stark and members of the Guardians. After Thanos uses the Stone, along with the other Stones, to wipe out half of all life in the universe, he destroys it to prevent further use.

In Avengers: Endgame, James Rhodes and Nebula quantum time travel to Morag in an alternate 2014, subduing the alternate 2014 Peter Quill before taking the alternate 2014 Power Stone in its Orb. The 2014 Power Stone (having been removed from the Orb) is then brought back to the main timeline and used to undo the Blip. During the battle, the alternate 2014 Thanos removes the Stone from the Nano Gauntlet and uses it to overpower Carol Danvers. The Stone, along with the other past Stones, is then used by Stark to erase the 2014 Thanos and his army. Later, Rogers returns the Stone to the alternate 2014.

In the second episode of What If...?, the Power Stone, still sealed within the orb, appears in an alternate timeline that copies the events of Guardians of the Galaxy, but is discovered by T'Challa, which the Ravagers later offer to the Collector. In the fifth episode, another alternate Power Stone appears in the possession of Thanos, who is zombified. In the eighth episode, a third alternate version of the Power Stone appears in the possession of Ultron (who also briefly appears at the end of the seventh episode), who steals the Stone from Thanos and uses it in order to conquer his universe and the Multiverse. In the ninth episode, after Ultron is killed by Arnim Zola, the Power Stone is taken by Erik Killmonger. When Zola attempts to take the Stones from Killmonger, they end up trapped in a pocket dimension along with the Stones.

Time Stone

Housed in the Eye of Agamotto by Earth's first sorcerer Agamotto, a Master of the Mystic Arts can use the Time Stone (green) to alter and manipulate time.

In Doctor Strange, Dr. Stephen Strange finds the Eye of Agamotto and learns how to use it to save the Earth from Dormammu by trapping him in a time loop until the demon abandons his plans for Earth. Strange returns the Eye of Agamotto to the Masters of the Mystic Arts' secret compound Kamar-Taj in Kathmandu, Nepal, though he is seen wearing it again in the mid-credits scene, which takes place during Thor: Ragnarok.

In Avengers: Infinity War, Ebony Maw attempts to steal the Time Stone from Strange, but is foiled by Tony Stark, Peter Parker, and Wong. While on the planet Titan (Thanos' homeworld), Strange uses the Time Stone to look into future timelines; viewing millions of possible outcomes of their conflict and learning of only one future in which they win. To ensure that future comes to pass, Strange surrenders the Stone to Thanos to save Stark. Thanos then uses the Time Stone in Wakanda to reverse Wanda Maximoff’s destruction of the Mind Stone, allowing him to rip that stone from Vision's forehead. After Thanos uses the Stones to erase half the universe, he destroys the Stones.

In Avengers: Endgame, Banner quantum time-travels to 2012 and speaks with the Ancient One to relinquish that timeline’s Time Stone, promising to return it after they are done using it to ensure that the alternate timelines will survive. The alternate 2012 Time Stone is then brought back to the main timeline, used to undo the Blip, and to defeat a past version of Thanos from an alternate 2014. Rogers later returns the Stone to the alternate 2012.

In the What If...? episode "What If... Doctor Strange Lost His Heart Instead of His Hands?", the Time Stone is shown to have additional abilities beyond those seen previously; an alternate version of Doctor Stephen Strange uses the Eye of Agamotto to travel through time, and try to avert his lover Christine Palmer's death, only to fail again and again due to it being an absolute point. During Strange's centuries-long ordeal of absorbing mystical creatures, he also uses the stone to keep himself from aging, and later offers to use it to de-age an elderly O'Bengh, who declines. After he absorbs his good counterpart, he overrides the stone to break the absolute point, and it subsequently becomes the sole remaining stone in his universe having brought its end on himself. In the fifth episode, another alternate version of the Time Stone appears in the possession of a zombified Thanos. In the eighth episode, a third alternate version of the Time Stone appears in the possession of Ultron (who also briefly appears at the end of the seventh episode), who takes it from Thanos in order to conquer the Multiverse. In the ninth episode, the Time Stone is used by Ultron to freeze time so he can reclaim the Soul Stone from Gamora. Strange then used his universe’s Time Stone to undo Ultron’s actions. After Ultron is killed by Arnim Zola, Erik Killmonger takes the Stones, but Zola tries to take them for himself, leading the two to fight over them. Strange and the Watcher trap them in a pocket dimension to keep the Stones separated.

Soul Stone
An object that has the ability to manipulate the soul and essence of a person, control life and death, and contains a pocket dimension called the Soul World. The Soul Stone (orange) is first seen in Avengers: Infinity War. It is revealed that at some time in the past, Thanos tasked Gamora to find the Soul Stone, as there is little record of its existence compared to the other Infinity Stones. Gamora found a map leading to where it was hidden: in a shrine on the planet Vormir, but chose to destroy the map and not to tell Thanos; only telling Nebula of it and swearing her to secrecy (later realizing that Thanos wasn't fooled by their lies). After Thanos captures and tortures Nebula, Gamora agrees to take him to Vormir, where they encounter the Red Skull (having been transported to the planet by the Tesseract and cursed to serve as the Stonekeeper). Thanos reluctantly sacrifices Gamora in order to fulfill the requirements to obtain the Soul Stone once the Red Skull explains to them that the Stone requires the sacrifice of a loved one to earn it. After completing the Infinity Gauntlet, Thanos is briefly transported into the Soul World and encounters a vision of a young Gamora. The Soul Stone is later destroyed to prevent further use.

In Avengers: Endgame, Natasha Romanoff and Clint Barton quantum time-travel to Vormir in an alternate 2014, where each attempts to sacrifice themselves to allow the other to return with the Stone, with Romanoff sacrificing herself so that Barton can receive the Stone. The alternate 2014 Soul Stone is then brought back to the main timeline and used to undo the Blip and to defeat a past version of Thanos from the alternate 2014. According to the film's directors, after completing the Nano Gauntlet to defeat 2014 Thanos and his army, Stark is briefly transported to the Soul World where he meets an older version of his daughter, Morgan. Rogers later returns the 2014 Soul Stone to the alternate 2014.

In the fifth episode of What If...?, an alternate version of the Soul Stone appears in the possession of a zombified Thanos. In the eighth episode, another alternate version of the Soul Stone appears in the possession of Ultron (who also briefly appears at the end of the seventh episode), who takes it from Thanos. Ultron proceeds to use the Stone along with the others in his conquest of the Multiverse. In the ninth episode, the Soul Stone is temporarily removed from Ultron by T’Challa. Shortly, Romanoff takes the Stone, but it gets knocked away. This leads the Guardians of the Multiverse to pursue it in a chase against Ultron. Eventually, Gamora is able to grab the Stone, but Ultron reclaims the Stone after freezing time with the Time Stone. However, after Arnim Zola kills Ultron, the Stone is taken by Killmonger, which Zola then tries to take from him. In order to keep the Stones separated, Zola, Killmonger, and the Stones are trapped by Strange and the Watcher in a pocket dimension.

Infinity Gauntlet

The Infinity Gauntlet is a metal gauntlet used to house the six stones. A right-handed gauntlet appears in Thor, where it's stored in Odin's vault; though this one was later revealed to be a fake by Hela in Thor: Ragnarok. The mid-credits scene of Avengers: Age of Ultron revealed Thanos had acquired a left-handed Infinity Gauntlet (the real one).

In Avengers: Infinity War, it is revealed Thanos invaded Nidavellir and forced Eitri to create the Infinity Gauntlet by threatening to kill his people, though he did so anyway once it was completed, as well as removing Eitri's hands to prevent his making anything else.

In Avengers: Endgame, after Thanos erases half of all life in the universe from existence with the Infinity Stones and destroys them to prevent his work from being undone, the gauntlet becomes permanently bound to his swollen arm, which is subsequently severed by Thor. However, the Avengers are able to travel through the Quantum Realm to retrieve versions of the Stones from the past and bring them into the present. Tony Stark, Bruce Banner, and Rocket Raccoon subsequently use nanotechnology to create a third, right-handed Nano Gauntlet in order to use the time-displaced Infinity Stones. Banner in his "Smart Hulk" form, due to being the most immune to the gamma radiation the Infinity Stones' combined powers emit, uses the gauntlet to reverse the Blip, although the strain of channeling the combined powers causes him considerable pain and leaves him with a crippled right arm. Later, a time-displaced Thanos tries to use the Nano Gauntlet to recreate the universe, but although he succeeds in acquiring it, Stark removes the time-displaced Infinity Stones from it and, having formed a makeshift gauntlet in his armor, uses them to erase Thanos and his forces, taking the empty Nano Gauntlet with them.

Alternate versions of the Infinity Gauntlet made brief appearances in the fifth and eighth episodes of What If...? and in a flashback sequence in Doctor Strange in the Multiverse of Madness.

Differences from comics
In the comics, Thanos is motivated to retrieve and use the Infinity Gems to impress Lady Death as she believed that the universe was overpopulated and headed for mass extinction. In the films, there is no mention of Lady Death, and Thanos wishes to reduce the population to avoid a repeat of his experience on Titan. Thanos retrieved each gem from a being who held it at the time. The In-Betweener had the Soul Gem, the Champion of the Universe had the Power Gem, the Gardener had the Time Gem, the Collector had the Reality Gem, the Runner had the Space Gem, and the Grandmaster had the Mind Gem. Furthermore, nobody else was even aware of Thanos, therefore no one attempted to stop him.

The colors of the stones were originally different in the comics. They were purple for Space, yellow for Reality, red for Power, blue for Mind, orange for Time, and green for Soul. The stone colors were updated in the Marvel Legacy series to match the film versions.

In the Marvel Cinematic Universe, the Time Stone is housed in the Eye of Agamotto and the Space Stone is housed in the Tesseract (Cosmic Cube). However, the Marvel Comics versions of these two stones have no connections to these relics.

Reception
The use of the Infinity Stones as a plot device led to fan speculation as to the location of as-yet undiscovered stones, and the possible appearance of additional stones. One theory popular with fans was that words describing the nature or location of the stones spelled out the name "THANOS", and that the as-yet undiscovered Soul Stone was somehow associated with the character Heimdall. Another theory proposed prior to the release of Avengers: Endgame was that it would involve a seventh Infinity Stone corresponding to an additional Infinity Gem from the comics, the Ego Stone.

Notes

References

External links
 Infinity Stones at the Marvel Cinematic Universe Wiki
 

Avengers (film series)
Fictional elements introduced in the 2010s
Fictional gemstones and jewelry
Marvel Cinematic Universe features